Kart racing or karting is a road racing variant of motorsport with open-wheel, four-wheeled vehicles known as go-karts or shifter karts. They are usually raced on scaled-down circuits, although some professional kart races are also held on full-size motorsport circuits. Karting is commonly perceived as the stepping stone to the higher ranks of motorsports, with most of the Formula One—including Sebastian Vettel, Nico Rosberg, Ayrton Senna, Max Verstappen, Lewis Hamilton, Michael Schumacher, Kimi Räikkönen, and Fernando Alonso—having begun their careers in karting.

Karts vary widely in speed, and some (known as superkarts) can reach speeds exceeding , while recreational go-karts intended for the general public may be limited to lower speeds.

History 

American Art Ingels is generally accepted to be the father of karting. A veteran hot rodder and a race car builder at Kurtis Kraft, he built the first kart in Southern California in 1956. Early karting events were held in the Rose Bowl Stadium car park. Instantly popular, Karting rapidly spread to other countries, and currently has a large following in Europe.

The first kart manufacturer was an American company, Go Kart Manufacturing Co. (1957). In 1959, McCulloch was the first company to produce engines for karts. Its first engine, the McCulloch MC-10, was an adapted chainsaw two-stroke engine. Later, in the 1960s, motorcycle engines were also adapted for kart use, before dedicated manufacturers, especially in Italy (IAME), started to build engines for the sport.

Components

Chassis 
The chassis are made of chrome moly tubing. There is no suspension, so chassis have to be flexible enough to work as a suspension and stiff enough not to break or give way on a turn. Kart chassis are classified in the United States as "Open", "Caged", "Straight" or "Offset". All Commission Internationale de Karting–, Fédération Internationale de l'Automobile–, or CIK-FIA-approved chassis are "Straight" and "Open".
Open karts have no roll cage.
Caged karts have a roll cage surrounding the driver; they are mostly used on dirt tracks.
In Straight chassis, the driver sits in the center. Straight chassis are used for sprint racing.
In Offset chassis, the driver sits on the left side. Offset chassis are used for left-turn-only speedway racing.

The stiffness of the chassis enables different handling characteristics for different circumstances. Typically, for dry conditions, a stiffer chassis is preferable, while in wet or other poor traction conditions, a more flexible chassis may work better. Temperature of the track can also affect handling and may prompt additional chassis adjustments. The best chassis allow for stiffening bars at the rear, front and side to be added or removed according to race conditions.

Braking is achieved by a disc brake mounted on the rear axle. Front disc brakes are used in most shifter kart classes and are increasingly popular in other classes; however, certain classes do not allow them. Shifter karts have dual master cylinders, one for the front and one for the rear, and are adjustable to allow for front/rear bias changes.

Professionally raced karts typically weigh , complete without driver. Avanti, Tony Kart, Trulli, Birel, CRG, Gillard, Intrepid, Remo Racing, Kosmic, Zanardi or FA Kart and EKS are a few well-known examples of the many European manufacturers of race-quality chassis. Emmick, Coyote, Bandit, Shadow, MGM, Titan, PRC and Margay are American companies producing kart chassis.

Engines 

Racing karts mostly use small two-stroke or four-stroke engines; however, as of 2022, there has been small-scale adoption of electric motors in racing karts.

 Four-stroke engines can be standard air-cooled industrial based engines, sometimes with small modifications, developing from about 5 to 20 hp. Briggs & Stratton, Tecumseh, Kohler, Robin, and Honda are manufacturers of such engines. They are adequate for racing and fun kart applications. There are also more powerful four-stroke engines available from manufacturers like Yamaha, TKM, Swissauto or Aixro (Wankel engine) offering from 15 hp up to 48 hp. They run to and around 11,000 rpm, and are manufactured specifically for karting. Those are used in some National Championship classes like the two-strokes.
 Two-stroke kart engines are developed and built by dedicated manufacturers. WTP, Comer, IAME (Parilla, Komet, Woltjer), TM, Vortex, Titan, REFO, Modena Engines, TKM, Yamaha are manufacturers of such engines. These can develop from about 8 hp for a single-cylinder 60 cc unit (MiniROK by Vortex) to over 90 hp for a twin 250 cc. Today, the most popular categories worldwide are those using the TaG 125 cc units. The recent 125 cc KF1 engines are electronically limited at 16,000 rpm. Most are water-cooled today; however, previously air-cooled engines dominated the sport.
 While electric motors have been used in low-performance amusement park karts for some time—particularly in indoor applications where fumes are a concern - higher-performance competitive racing karts are now becoming commercially available.  For instance, manufacturer Blue Shock Racing offers a range of electric karts for both junior and senior competitors with performance comparable to combustion-powered karts, and has held race series for them. Combustion kart engine maker Rotax also offers an electric kart motor and has held racing events for karts fitted with it.

Transmission 
Purpose of transmission: There are three reasons for having a transmission in the automotive power train or drive train. The transmission can:
 Provide torque needed to move the vehicle under a variety of road and load conditions. It does this by changing the gear ratio between the engine crankshaft and vehicle drive wheel.
 Be shifted into reverse so the vehicle can move backward.
 Be shifted into neutral for starting the engine and running it without turning the drive wheels.

Karts do not have a differential. The lack of a differential means that one rear tire must slide while cornering. This is achieved by designing the chassis so that the inside rear tire lifts up slightly when the kart turns the corner. This allows the tire to lose some of its grip and slide or lift off the ground completely.

Power is transmitted from the engine to the rear axle by a chain. Both engine and axle sprockets are removable. Their ratio must be adapted to the track configuration to obtain the most performance from the engine.

In the early days, karts were direct drive, requiring push starts. The inconvenience of that configuration led to the centrifugal clutch for the club level classes. Dry centrifugal clutches are now used in many categories; Rotax Max is one example. They have become the norm as the top international classes have switched to 125 cc clutch-equipped engines as of January 2007.

Tires 
Wheels and tires are much smaller than those used on a normal car. Wheels are made of magnesium alloy, aluminum, or composite materials. Tires can support cornering forces in excess of 2 g (20 m/s²), depending on chassis, engine, and motor setup. Some car tire manufacturers, such as Bridgestone, Dunlop, and Maxxis make tires for karts. There are also specific kart tire manufacturers, which include MG, Vega, MOJO, LeCont, Cobra, Hoosier and Burris.

Similarly to other motorsports, kart tires have different types for use appropriate to track conditions:
 Slicks, for dry track. Slick kart tires come in many different compounds, from very soft (maximum grip) to very hard (amusement and rental karts, less grip but long life span). In international level racing, because the drivers are free to choose their tires and because of the short duration of each round (10 to 20 minutes maximum), these are some of the softest tires found in motorsport.
 Rain tires, or "wets", for wet weather. They are grooved, made of soft compound, and are narrower than slicks. Not all racing classes allow rain tires.
 Special, such as spiked tires for icy conditions, or "cuts/grooved" for high grip dirt/clay speedways. Cuts are slicks modified with a lathe to optimize handling. Tire manufacturers such as Hoosier and Burris also make a slightly larger grooved tire only used in dirt track racing.

Data acquisition 

As in other motor sports, several data acquisition systems have been developed for kart racing. These systems allow the driver to monitor from a display fixed on the steering wheel some parameters such as RPM, timing of laps (including sectors), number of laps, best lap, cooling system temperature, exhaust gas temperature and sometimes speed or even gear for shifter karts.

Some of those systems are able to record (logging) laps data from the sensors, allowing replay of an entire running session or/and direct download to a personal computer equipped with a data analysis software. More sophisticated systems allow for more information such as lateral and longitudinal acceleration (g-force), throttle position, steering wheel position and brake pressure.

Racing 
Kart racing is generally accepted as the most economical form of motorsport available on four wheels. As a free-time activity, it can be performed by almost anybody, and as a motorsport in itself, it is one of the sports regulated by FIA (under the name of CIK), permitting licensed racing for anyone from the age of 8 onward.

In the United States, there is not as much FIA involvement; instead, many organizations regulate racing, such as the IKF (International Kart Federation), WKA (World Karting Association), KART (Karters of America Racing Triad), USPKS (United States Pro Karting Series) SKUSA (SuperKartsUSA).

In the UK, the Motor Sports Association (MSA) regulates most "owner driver" Karting. Some associations, such as NatSKA (National Schools Karting Association), organize race meetings throughout the country under the authority of the MSA.
Various four-stroke "hire kart" series such as EPEC (European Prokart Endurance Championship) or BRKC (British Rental Kart Championship) fall outside the governance of the MSA. Billed as the UK's first national karting league, the Elite Karting League also falls outside of MSA governance.

In Australia, kart racing is administered by the one of the following Karting bodies:
Australian Auto Sport Alliance - 6 clubs
Australian Independent Dirt Kart Association - 19 clubs
Australian Kart Racers Alliance - 3 clubs
Karting Australia - 6 state associations (previously known as Australian Karting Association granted rights for CIK-FIA racing via Motorsport Australia)
Karting NSW - 24 clubs, separated from Australian Karting Association in 2019
Speedway Karting Association of Australia - 16 clubs
Wheatbelt Dirt Karting Association - 4 clubs
 Unaffiliated - 8 clubs

Racing classes start at age 7 or 8 (5 in the United States with "Kid Karts") and generally run in 3-year age groupings or weight divisions until "senior" status is reached at age 15 or 16, depending on the series.

Racing formats 
Typically, race formats are one of the following:

Sprint 

Sprint racing takes place on dedicated kart circuits resembling small road courses, with left and right turns, Hair Pins, Chicanes, short and Long Straight a ways.  Tracks range from 1/4-mile (400 metres) to over 1 mile (1,600 metres) in length.

The sprint format is a series of short-duration races, normally for a small number of laps, that qualify for a final which last 20 minutes or more, with a variety of point scoring calculations to determine the event's overall winner. Typical duration does not normally exceed 25 minutes. Here, speed and successful passing is of the most importance. It normally occurs in the format of qualifying, one to three heats and a final race for trophy positions.

Sprint Racing in the United States and Canada are held at three primary levels, Club Racing (local races at purpose-built tracks), Regional Racing - Like the California Pro Kart Challenge, The Texas Sprint Racing Series, The Florida based Sunshine Karting Championship Series, Route 66 in the Midwest and the F1 Gear Up Challenge in the Northeast. National Level Karting takes place across North America in dedicated National Series like the SKUSA Pro Tour, the USPKS Championship Series, WKA Manufacture's Cup and the ROK CUP USA. The SKUSA Pro Tour Championship is one of the most coveted, and the SKUSA Super Nats Event held in Las Vegas annually is one of the largest Kart Races in the world attracting drivers from every continent. The SKUSA SuperNats event has been run continuously for 25 years now, and a SuperNats win is considered a legendary win in Karting circles.

The FIA championships, including the Karting World Championship, SKUSA SuperNats and all SKUSA Pro Tour, USPKS and ROK Cup USA Nationals take place in this format.

Sprint Racing can be held at a dedicated purpose-built Track (most of which also rent club karts for family fun), and sprint races are also held at kart tracks that exist at many major auto sports complexes like Daytona International Speedway, Charlotte Motor Speedway, Pittsburgh Race Complex, NOLA Motorsports in New Orleans, Homestead Motor Speedway, and Road America. Sprint races are also held at temporary kart circuits that can be built in parking areas at large stadiums and casinos throughout the United States. Additionally, there are "Street Races" where racing is taking place on city streets on temporary circuits like some of the Indy car races.

Endurance 

Endurance races last for an extended period, ranging from 30 minutes up to 24 hours or more, for one or more drivers. In general, consistency, reliability, and pit strategy is of greater importance than all out speed.

Called "enduro" racing in the United States, most WKA and IKF sanctioned events typically last 30 minutes (sprint enduro) or 45 minutes (laydown enduro) and are run continuously without pit stops. Enduro events are held on full-size road racing circuits that are usually between 1.5 and 4 miles in length.

As well as the famous 24 Hours of Le Mans race for automobiles there is also a 24-hours event for karts which takes place at the kart circuit Alain Prost at Le Mans, France. This race has taken place since 1986 and its winners list include four-time Champ Car champion Sébastien Bourdais (in 1996).

Endurance racing is also considered a more affordable way of getting into karting. In South Africa, the 24 Hours of Karting Festival race is held annually and lasts 24 hours with multiple classes participating. This event is hosted by the Prokart SSS Club near Johannesburg. The most popular class runs the Honda GX390 four-stroke engine, which is both affordable and durable, keeping running costs to a minimum. The Prokart Super Single Series, also known as Prokart SSS, has been running for more than 20 years and has proven to be a very popular entry platform for drivers of all ages who want to get into karting. Many clubs worldwide have taken on four-stroke endurance karting for this reason, since two-stroke karting can be very expensive.

Speedway 
Speedway racing takes place on asphalt or clay oval tracks which are normally between 1/10-mile and 1/4-mile long. Tracks primarily consist of two straights and four left-turn corners, few tracks are symmetric and often the shape parallels that of an egg or a tri-oval.

"Offset" kart chassis have been developed for precise handling and adjustability in left-turn-only racing competition taking place on oval and tri-oval tracks. Depending on the track material, different tires are used on the kart.

Speedway kart races range in length from 4 laps for a trophy dash, to 20 laps for a main event.

The two chief racing formats used in dirt speedway karting are heat races and timed laps qualification:

The International Kart Federation (IKF) runs a racing format of two 10 lap heats followed by a 20 lap final. Finishing positions in the two heat races are used to calculate the starting position in the feature race.
The World Karting Association (WKA) uses time qualifying. Karts equipped with transponders are sent out onto the track in groups of 5 or less to try to achieve the fastest lap time. Positions for the 20 laps feature event are determined by qualifying time.
The American Kart Racing Association (AKRA) uses group transponder qualifying to calculate starting positions for 20-lap features.

Racing categories 
There are many different classes in kart. One of the fastest growing in the United States is Lo206. The general classes are 125cc Shifter, 100cc tag, 125cc tag and then the X30 equivalents of these karts.

International 

The CIK-FIA sanctions international championships in OK, OKJ, KZ1, KZ2 and Superkart. These are regarded as the top-level classes of karting and are also raced in national championships worldwide. The World Championship is decided here. In May 2019 it held the international under-15 championship. The driver who finished first overall was Vlad Sputzki (Russia) followed by Daniel Smith (England) and then followed by Maximilien Blank (Australia)
CIK-FIA categories:
OK (the top level) and OKJ for a younger age group. All are using the same water-cooled no-gearbox 125 cc "long life" two-stroke engines, which are direct drive, each with different technical specifications covering mufflers, air boxes, carburetor, speed limiters, etc.
KZ1 and KZ2, both 125 cc gearbox categories.
Superkart, a 250 cc gearbox category.

Non CIK-FIA categories:
The Kart World Championship (or KWC) as opposed to the FIA's "Karting World Championship" uses 4-stroke rental karts and travels to a different country each year.

National 
In the UK, the most celebrated karting series is the National karting series, also known as Super One. There are three types of Super One championships:

MSA series: KF2, KF3, Formula KGP, Super Cadet, Cadet & Bambino
Rotax series: Minimax, Junior Max, Senior Max, Senior Max 177
TKM series: Formula Junior TKM, Formula TKM Extreme, TKM Senior 4-stroke and since 2006, Honda Cadet

Other UK National Championships include:
Birel BirelART series UK: Cadet 60cc, Junior 100cc, Senior Light 125cc, Senior Heavy 125cc

The BRKC is the UK's rental karting National championship, and the UK's official feeder series to the rental Kart World Championship.

NatSKA is a budget karting association set up for schools and youth groups in the UK, with 13 classes.

In the United States, Dirt oval classes (which often use Briggs & Stratton industrial engines) are prominent in the Southeast and Midwest. In the West, European style sprint racing is much more common. In particular, 125cc shifter karts using Honda CR125 power units have gained tremendous popularity in recent years.

In Australia, classes include Cadet (previously called Midget),Junior KA4, Junior KA3, X30, KZ2, Senior KA3, Senior TAG (Restricted and Unrestricted). Most classes run a light and heavy category.

Many people race worldwide in Spec series such as X30 125cc (a TaG class).

Racing licences 
As in other disciplines in motorsports, a license is required to drive a racing kart on a circuit or enter competitions. The licenses, issued by governing bodies, are provided by clubs or associations. Basic insurance coverage is usually included in the licence annual fee. In some countries, such as France, regulations require the drivers to pass a medical exam each year.

License classes differ between countries according to age groups or levels. Most of the time a Practice License can be easily obtained, while a Racing License might require a capability assessment.

Driver equipment 
For their safety, kart drivers are required to wear proper equipment:
 Full-face helmet (Snell SA2020 or K2020 certification is required for racing, K2020 is same as SA2020 without fire resistance) 
 Driving suit (abrasion resistant overalls with at least one Cordura external layer, CIK-FIA Level 2 homologation for top level racing)
 Gloves
 Driving boots (ankles must be covered)

Rib protector, racing balaclava and neck brace, although highly recommended, are optional in most countries. None of the above need to be made of fire retardant material. Superkart drivers are required to wear leather overalls, similar to those used in motorcycling.

As a learning tool 
Kart racing is usually used as a low-cost and relatively safe way to introduce drivers to motor racing. Drivers can start at the age of 6 in the Motorsport UK Bambino Championship, and even from the age of 5 in the Bambino Kart Club Championship. Many Formula One drivers grew up racing karts, most prominent among them being World Champions Ayrton Senna, Michael Schumacher, Alain Prost, Fernando Alonso, Kimi Räikkönen, Jenson Button, Lewis Hamilton, Sebastian Vettel and Max Verstappen. Many NASCAR drivers also got their start in racing from karts, such as Darrell Waltrip, Danica Patrick, Ricky Rudd, Juan Pablo Montoya, Tony Stewart, and Jeff Gordon. 

In August 2009, in anticipation to a possible return to F1 with Ferrari, Formula One world champion Michael Schumacher did some preparation driving a kart in Lonato, Italy. Schumacher also raced at the SKUSA SuperNationals, an event taking place each year in Las Vegas, along with F1 drivers Sébastien Buemi and Nelson Piquet Jr. Felipe Massa also used karting in September 2009 to test his condition in Brazil, two months after his Hungarian Grand Prix accident during qualifying.

Recreational, concession and indoor karts

See also 
 Kart circuit
 Kart manufacturers
 List of kart racing championships
Related:
 Capeta
 Crosskart
 Go-kart
 Kart racing game
 Micro kart
 Small engine
 Superkart

References

External links 

 KartingForum.co.uk Your #1 Karting Community!
 Karting Classifieds Karts and Karting related items for sale or wanted.
 Kart Directory UK The Home For British Karters.
 Kartpulse a worldwide resource for new and existing kart racers.

Governing Bodies:
 Motorsport UK Bambino Championship - Motorsport UK Bambino Championship
 corporate sports league web site
 CIK-FIA web site
 MSA – Motor Sports Association – Governing body for motor sports in Great Britain
 IKF – International Kart Federation – Governing body for the sport of kart racing in the US, mainly West Coast
 WKA – World Karting Association – Governing body for karting in the US, mainly East Coast
 AKRA – American Kart Racing Association – Governing body for speedway oval karting in the US
 AKA – Australian Karting Association – Governing body for karting in Australia
 ASN Canada – Governing body for kart racing in Canada
 NatSKA – National Association of Schools and Youth Group Karting – UK
 VKA – Vintage Karting Association – Association for support of karts from karting's 1956 inception to 1975

 
Open wheel racing
American inventions
Sports car racing
Sports originating in the United States